Oakley is a hamlet in Staffordshire, England. It is within Mucklestone ward of Loggerheads Parish. Oakley Hall, a former seat of the Chetwode family, is a well known attraction.

Hamlets in Staffordshire